Bosse Field is a baseball stadium located in Evansville, Indiana. Opened in 1915, it was the first municipally owned sports stadium in the United States and is the third-oldest ballpark still in regular use for professional baseball, surpassed only by Fenway Park (1912) in Boston and Wrigley Field (1914) in Chicago.

It is the home field for the professional Evansville Otters of the independent Frontier League, as well as high school and American Legion games, and in the past hosted spring training for the Detroit Tigers, college baseball, high school, college, and NFL football, college soccer, and concerts. Six Baseball Hall of Fame members played for Evansville teams at Bosse Field during their minor league careers, including Chuck Klein, Hank Greenberg, Warren Spahn, Bob Uecker, Bert Blyleven and Jack Morris. The historic stadium was also used in 1991 by Columbia Pictures for filming numerous game scenes in the 1992 comedy-drama, A League of Their Own.

History
Benjamin Bosse, mayor of Evansville from 1914 to 1922, reached an agreement with Thomas Garvin's family shortly after taking office in January 1914 to purchase land on the north side of the city for a park.  However, the city was in a deficit and could not afford the full $50,000 price.  Mayor Bosse conceived of the plan to sell part of the land to the school board who would then build a new stadium to be used for school functions as well as Evansville's baseball team, of which Bosse was a co-owner.  When the president of the school board opposed the plan, Bosse had him replaced with a friend, and the new school board both approved the project and also voted to name it Bosse Field in honor of the mayor.  Construction was completed the following summer, and Bosse Field opened on June 17, 1915. A Central League record crowd of 8,082 fans attended the stadium dedication and opening game, a 4–0 Evansville victory. Evansville was in third place when they moved to Bosse Field, but went on to win the league championship in 1915.

Ten baseball teams other than the Otters have played at Bosse Field. Some of the most famous are the Evansville Triplets (1970–84), Evansville Braves (1946–57), Evas/Pocketeers/Hubs (1919–1931) and the Evansville River Rats (1914–15). The River Rats had played in Evansville previously from (1903–1910) and (1901–1902). The Triplets won the American Association titles in 1972, 1975, and 1979. The River Rats won the Central League title in 1908 and 1915. The Braves won the Three-I League title in 1946, 1948, 1956, and 1957.

From 1921 to 1922, Bosse Field was used as a football stadium and was home to the Evansville Crimson Giants of the NFL.

The Otters franchise came to Evansville in 1995 and have attracted a record number of fans for the league. In 2006 the Otters won the Frontier League title.

Baseball Hall of Fame members Hank Greenberg, Chuck Klein, Edd Roush, Warren Spahn, and Sam Thompson played at Bosse Field during their careers; another 95 Hall of Fame members visited Bosse Field on opposing teams. There have been over 20 Major League Baseball players from Evansville and dozens of Minor Leaguers.

Football Hall of Fame member Bob Griese played high school football and American Legion baseball at Bosse Field; Don Mattingly, Andy Benes, Rob Maurer, Jeff Schulz, Alan Benes and Jamey Carroll all played at Bosse Field during their high school and/or college careers.

Former/current professional teams

Current / former professional teams who have called Bosse Field home, have won a combined 10 league titles.

Concerts
 July 2, 1972:  Freedom Festival and Ice Cream Social with Ike & Tina Turner Revue, Edgar Winter, Dr. John 'The Night Tripper', Cactus, Black Oak Arkansas, Spirit, Country Joe & The Fish, Howlin' Wolf, John Lee Hooker, Boones Farm and New Riders of the Purple Sage
 August 20, 1974:  Allman Brothers Band, Elvin Bishop, REO Speedwagon

References

External links
Bosse Field at Evansville Convention & Visitors Bureau website

Detroit Tigers spring training venues
Minor league baseball venues
Defunct National Football League venues
High school baseball venues in the United States
Sports venues in Evansville, Indiana
Spring training ballparks
Frontier League ballparks
Sports venues completed in 1915
1915 establishments in Indiana
Evansville, Indiana
Baseball venues in Indiana